Barnstable, Massachusetts, has more than 75 entries on the National Register of Historic Places.  For listings elsewhere in Barnstable County, see National Register of Historic Places listings in Barnstable County, Massachusetts.

Current listings

|}

Former listings

|}

See also
National Register of Historic Places listings in Barnstable County, Massachusetts
List of National Historic Landmarks in Massachusetts

References

 
Barnstable
 
Barnstable, Massachusetts